Henry Herford (born 24 February 1947 in Edinburgh, Scotland) is a Scottish baritone singer.

He read Classics and English at Cambridge University, and studied singing at the Royal Northern College of Music in Manchester where he was awarded the Curtis Gold Medal. He is currently the RNCM's Tutor in French Song. He joined the Glyndebourne Opera Chorus for 1977 and 1978, singing leading roles on tour, and since then has performed over seventy roles with opera companies throughout the UK and Europe, including at Covent Garden, Glyndebourne and Scottish Opera.

Notable among his roles are the Count (The Marriage of Figaro), Guglielmo and Alfonso (Così fan tutte), the title role in Don Giovanni, Germont (La Traviata), Silvio (I Pagliacci), Dr Falke (Die Fledermaus), the Forester (The Cunning Little Vixen), Smirnov (William Walton's The Bear), and Demetrius (A Midsummer Night's Dream), which he recorded for Virgin Records.

Herford has made a speciality of the music of Charles Ives, having recorded many of his songs.

References

20th-century Scottish male opera singers
Scottish operatic baritones
Musicians from Edinburgh
1947 births
Living people
21st-century Scottish male opera singers
Albany Records artists